EURid vzw (European Registry for Internet Domains) is the nonprofit organisation appointed by the European Commission as the domain name registry that operates the .eu top-level domain and its variants in other scripts – .ею (.eu in Cyrillic) as of 1 June 2016, .ευ (in Greek) as of 14 November 2019.

Operations 

Established in Belgium, with its headquarters located in Diegem, EURid is a consortium of two European ccTLD operators: DNS Belgium (.be) and IIT-CNR (.it). In May 2003 the Commission designated it as the .eu domain name registry. In October 2006, EURid opened their first branch office in Stockholm. Two further branch offices were opened in Italy and the Czech Republic since then. EURid's strategic committee consists of Sandra Hoferichter (Chairwoman), Pedro Oliveira (Vice-Chair), Marco Pierani, Luc Hendrickx, Marco Conti, Delia Belciu, Marie-Emmanuelle Haas, Tomáš Maršálek, Marko Bonac, Jakub Christoph, Luca Cassetti, and Greg Mroczkowski.

EURid uses the Extensible Provisioning Protocol (EPP) which enables registrars to perform operations on .eu domain names directly.

EURid's website is available in the 24 official languages of the European Union.

Domain holders outside the European Union  

Residents, companies and organisations based in countries within the European Economic Area (EEA) but outside the European Union are able to use .eu domains, namely Iceland, Liechtenstein or Norway.

On 1 January 2021, EURid disabled all domains belonging to UK individuals and businesses following Brexit, upon which the United Kingdom left the EEA.

References

External links 
 
 WHOIS for .eu domain names

Domain Name System
European Union telecommunications policy
Information technology organizations based in Europe
Internet and the European Union
Organizations established in 2003